Radu may refer to:

People
 Radu (given name), Romanian masculine given name
 Radu (surname), Romanian surname
 Rulers of Wallachia, see 
 Prince Radu of Romania (born 1960), disputed pretender to the former Romanian throne

Other uses
 Radu (weapon), a Romanian radiological weapon
 Radu, Iran (disambiguation), multiple places
 A tributary of the Mraconia in Mehedinți County, Romania
 A tributary of the Tarcău in Neamț County, Romania
 Radu Vladislas, a fictional vampire and the primary antagonist of the Subspecies film series

See also
 Radu Negru (disambiguation)
 Radu Vodă (disambiguation)
 
 Ruda (disambiguation)